Their Springtime of Life was a Canadian documentary television miniseries which aired on CBC Television in 1972.

Premise
This documentary series concerned the Canadian Army during the two world wars. Sources for footage included the National Film Board of Canada and various foreign sources.

Scheduling
This hour-long series was broadcast on Tuesadays at 10:00 p.m. (Eastern time) from 22 August to 12 September 1972.

Episodes
 22 August 1972: World War I
 29 August 1972: the years between the world wars (until World War II)
 5 September 1972: World War II – Italian campaigns
 12 September 1972: World War II – European campaigns

References

External links
 

CBC Television original programming
1972 Canadian television series debuts
1972 Canadian television series endings
1970s Canadian documentary television series